George Browning Handley is a professor of humanities at Brigham Young University (BYU) who has often written on issues related to environmentalism.

Early life 
Handley was raised in Connecticut, United States.

Education 
Handley has a bachelor's degree from Stanford University and a masters and PhD from the University of California, Berkeley.

Career 
He taught at Northern Arizona University before joining the BYU faculty in 1998. He also served as chair of BYU's department of humanities, classics and comparative literature.

Works 
Handley's works have focused on the interaction of culture and the physical environment. His most cited work is Caribbean Literature and the Environment: Between Nature and Culture co-authored with Elizabeth M. DeLoughrey. 

Among other works by Handley are Home Waters: A Year of Recompenses on the Provo River (Salt Lake
City: University of Utah Press, 2010), New World Poetics: Nature and the Adamic Imagination of Whitman, Neruda, and Walcott (Athens, Georgia: University of Georgia Press, 2007), Stewardship and Creation: LDS Perspectives on the Environment  and Postslavery Literatures in the Americas: Family Portraits in Black and White (Charlottesville: University Press of Virginia, 2000).

Religion 
Handley is a member of the Church of Jesus Christ of Latter-day Saints (LDS Church). In the LDS Church he has served as a bishop and counselor in a stake presidency.

Personal life 
Handley and his wife Amy are the parents of four children. The family lives in Provo, Utah.

Notes

References
 Mormon Scholars Testify entry
 University of Utah press article on Handley's book Home Waters
By Common Consent blog entry on Handley
Richard Cracroft's review of Home Waters
LDS Earth Stewardship profile of Handley
Dialogue: A Journal of Mormon Thought 

American leaders of the Church of Jesus Christ of Latter-day Saints
Stanford University alumni
University of California, Berkeley alumni
Northern Arizona University faculty
Brigham Young University faculty
Living people
Latter Day Saints from California
Latter Day Saints from Arizona
Latter Day Saints from Utah
Year of birth missing (living people)